The Scorpidinae, commonly known as halfmoons, knifefishes, and sweeps, are a subfamily of the family Kyphosidae, the sea chubs, a family of marine fish in the order Perciformes. The Scorpidinae are distributed throughout the Pacific and east Indian Oceans, with species occurring in the waters of North America, South America, Asia, Australia, and numerous islands. Most inhabit the continental shelf in shallow rock and kelp reefs and deeper offshore reefs, whilst others are found well offshore in a pelagic setting. Most of the Scorpidinae are carnivorous, taking a variety of small crustaceans, although some are partly herbivorous. A number of the larger species are fished commercially and recreationally, and are considered good table fish.

Classification
Fishbase lists 12 species in 5 genera under the subfamily Scorpidinae, the genera are set out below

 Bathystethus Gill, 1893
 Labracoglossa Peters, 1866
 Medialuna Jordan & Fesler, 1893
 Neoscorpis J.L.B. Smith, 1931
 Scorpis Valenciennes, 1832

The 5th edition of Fishes of the World includes Neoscorpis within the subfamily Scorpidinae but other authorities place it within the Kyphosinae, although these authorities usually classify the subfamilies of the Kyphosidae as families.

References

 
Kyphosidae
Taxa named by Albert Günther